SVM

SVM (специальная высо-комодульная) is a high-molecular polyethylene aramid fiber domestically produced in Russia under the brand name Rusar. It is a main component in the production of military infantry equipment.

Politics
 Alliance of Vojvodina Hungarians (Savez vojvođanskih Mađara), a political party in Serbia
 Sanjay Vichar Manch, a political party in India

Technology
 Scanning voltage microscopy
 Secure Virtual Machine, a virtualization technology by AMD
 Shared Virtual Memory, another AMD technology for computation on its GPUs with HSA/ROCm.
 Solaris Volume Manager, software
 Space vector modulation, in power electronics, a modulating technique to give power to a load
 Support vector machine, in machine learning
Stroboscopic effect visibility measure (SVM), a measure for assessing a type of temporal light artefacts

Other
 SVM (company)
 Saskatchewan Volunteer Medal
 Schuylkill Valley Metro
 Slavomolisano (ISO 639-3 svm), a dialect of Serbo-Croatian spoken in Italy